Hongsa Purnaveja (born 28 March 1928) is a Thai former sports shooter. He competed in the 50 metre rifle, prone event at the 1964 Summer Olympics.

References

External links
 

1928 births
Possibly living people
Hongsa Purnaveja
Hongsa Purnaveja
Shooters at the 1964 Summer Olympics
Place of birth missing (living people)
Hongsa Purnaveja